Kiltimagh railway station is a disused railway station close to the town of Kiltimagh in County Mayo. Originally the station was opened in 1895 as part of the route between Claremorris and Sligo. It was closed to passenger traffic in 1963, with goods traffic ending in 1975. Following its closure, the station and surrounding area was converted in the 1980s into the Kiltimagh Museum, with displays and artefacts of local history and culture.

The Western Railway Corridor was to be rebuilt as part of the government's Transport 21 plan, however only the section from Limerick to Athenry was completed. The future stages, currently unfunded, would see the line restored between Tuam and Claremorris; and then Claremorris and Sligo, with Kiltimagh as the first stop.

As of 2013, a Velo-rail (railbike) scheme was being proposed for Kiltimagh.

1916 train crash
On 19 December 1916, in foggy conditions, the driver of a ballast train failed to see a red signal at the station. The train, carrying many track workers, crashed into an empty cattle train, killing six people.

References

External links
 Kiltimagh Museum

Disused railway stations in County Mayo
Proposed railway stations in the Republic of Ireland
Museums in County Mayo
Local museums in the Republic of Ireland